The 1991 Australian Under-16 Individual Speedway Championship was the tenth running of the Australian Under-16 Speedway Championship organised by Motorcycling Australia for bikes with 125cc engines. The final took place on 12 January 1991 at the  Sidewinders Speedway in Adelaide, South Australia.

Local Adelaide based riders dominated the meeting filling eight of the top ten places. 1990 Australian Championship runner-up Ryan Sullivan took out his first Australian Championship with an unbeaten 15 point maximum to lead home Ashley Watson and Brett Woodifield who won a four-way runoff for third place over Troy Wyten, Ford Keane and Victorian Jason Stewart. Sullivan turned 16 a week after the championship and graduated into the senior ranks.

1991 Australian Under-16 Solo Championship
 12 January
  Adelaide, South Australia - Sidewinders Speedway
 Referee:  Sam Bass

See also
 Motorcycle speedway
 Sport in Australia

References

Further reading
 

Speedway in Australia
Australia
Individual Speedway Championship